Petr Čech (6 January 1944 – 11 December 2022) was a Czech former hurdler. He competed in the men's 110 metres hurdles at the 1972 Summer Olympics.

References

External links
 
 

1944 births
2022 deaths
Athletes (track and field) at the 1972 Summer Olympics
Czech male hurdlers
Olympic athletes of Czechoslovakia
People from Litoměřice District
Sportspeople from the Ústí nad Labem Region